The 1984–85 National Hurling League was the 54th season of the National Hurling League (NHL), an annual hurling competition for the GAA county teams.

Division 1
Limerick came into the season as defending champions of the 1983-84 season. Offaly and Tipperary entered Division 1 as the promoted teams.

On 14 April 1985, Limerick won the title following a 3-12 to 1-7 win over Clare in the final. It was their second league title in succession and their 9th National League title overall.

Tipperary and Wexford were relegated from Division 1.

Laois's Eugene Fennelly was the Division 1 top scorer with 2-44.

Table

Group stage

Play-offs

Knock-out stage

Quarter-finals

Semi-finals

Final

Scoring statistics

Top scorers in a single game

Division 2

Table

Division 3

Table

Division 4

Knock-out stage

Final

References

National Hurling League seasons
League
League